This is a list of the complete squads for the 2020 Rugby Europe Championship, an annual rugby union tournament contested by the national rugby teams of Belgium, Spain, Georgia, Portugal, Romania and Russia. Georgia are the defending champions.

Note: Number of caps and players' ages are indicated as of 1 February 2020 – the tournament's opening day.

Belgium
On 20 January 2020, Guillaume Ajac named a 48-man squad for the 2020 Rugby Europe Championship.

Head coach:  Guillaume Ajac

Note – Players in bold have played more matches than shown above but there is no information of Belgium caps pre-2013.

Georgia
On 17 January 2020, Levan Maisashvili named his 34-man squad for the 2020 Rugby Europe Championship.

Head coach:  Levan Maisashvili (interim)

Call-ups
On 5 February, Akaki Tabutsatde was called up to replace Mirian Modebadze and Giorgi Kveseladze due to minor injuries whereas Konstantin Mikautadze left the squad due to club commitments.

On 16 February, Lasha Tabidze was called up into the squad while Levan Chilachava, Beka Gigashvili, Mikheil Nariashvili and Vasil Lobzhanidze leave the squad for the less-experienced players to play. Also, Tornike Jalaghonia was called up to replace Otar Giorgadze who left the squad as well due to a minor injury.

Portugal
On 29 January 2020, Patrice Lagisquet named his 26-man squad for the 2020 Rugby Europe Championship.

Head coach:  Patrice Lagisquet

Note – Jorge Abecasis has been added to the squad on the 31 January 2020.

Romania
On 29 January 2020, Andy Robinson named a 33-man squad for the 2020 Rugby Europe Championship.

Head coach:  Andy Robinson

Call-ups
On 3 February, Ionel Badiu, Costel Burțilă and Mihai Macovei were called up to replace Horațiu Pungea, Cosmin Manole, Vlad Neculau, Alexandru Bucur and Cătălin Fercu due to a contagious flu.

On 14 February, Horațiu Pungea, Cosmin Manole, Vlad Neculau and Cătălin Fercu have been re-called after having the flu along with Alexandru Savin, Marius Iftimiciuc Valentin Popârlan, Florian Roșu and Moa Mua Maliepo being called up for the first time this season to replace Ionel Badiu, Iulian Hartig and Țăruș.

Russia

On 21 January 2020, Lyn Jones announced a 32-man squad for the 2020 Rugby Europe Championship.

Head coach:  Lyn Jones

Call-ups
On 28 January, Evgeny Elgin was called up to replace Alexsandr Il`in (who will remain in the squad for the match versus Belgium) for the match versus Spain due to a minor injury sustained by Alexsandr Il`in.

On 29 January, Shamil Magomedov and Patris Peki were called up to replace the players Tagir Gadzhiev and Bogdan Fedotko due to injuries accumulated during training.

On 4 February, Alexey Scobyola was called up to replace Andrey Polivalov while Tagir Gadzhiev and Stanislav Sel'skiy left the squad due to injuries accumulated during the opening match against Spain.

On 6 February, Valery Morozov was called up for the match against Belgium.

On 14 February, Nikita Churashov, German Godlyuk, Roman Khodin, Dennis Mashkin, Andrei Ostrikov and Konstantin Uzunov were called up for the match against Portugal to replace Stepan Seryakov Sergey Chernyshev, Vasily Dorofeev, Nikita Vavilin and Khetag Dzobelov whilst Aleksandr Il`in, Alexei Shcherban and Yuri Kushnarev left the squad due to injuries from the previous match versus Belgium.

Spain
On 20 January 2020, Santiago Santos named a 31-man squad for the 2020 Rugby Europe Championship.

Head coach:  Santiago Santos

Call-ups
On 3 February, Marco Pinto Ferrer, Asier Usarraga and Charly Malie, Tomás Munilla and Martín Alonso were called up to replace Matthew Bebe Smith, Michael Sequoia Hogg, Kerman Aurrekoetxea and Gauthier Minguillon.

On 17 February, José Díaz and Nicolás Jurado were called up to replace Fernando Martín López who sustained an injury in the previous match versus Georgia along with Manuel Mora, Álvar Gimeno, Nicolás Nieto, Federico Castiglioni, Baltazar Taibo and Sergio Molinero also joining the squad while Ien-Leight Ashcroft, Charly Malie and Guillaume Rouet left the squad due to club commitments. Also Jordi Jorba leaves the squad due to a major injury sustained in the opening match.

References

Rugby Europe Championship